Gaillardia serotina is a North American species of flowering plant in the sunflower family. It is native to the southeastern United States. Flower heads are yellow, each with 12 ray flowers. Leaves are sessile (lacking a petiole), and with teeth along the edges.

References

serotina
Flora of the Southeastern United States
Endemic flora of the United States
Plants described in 1788
Flora without expected TNC conservation status